In Search of Forever is a science fiction art book by Rodney Matthews published by Paper Tiger Books in 1985.

Plot summary
In Search of Forever is a book of paintings, sketches, photographs, and commentary.

Reception
Dave Langford reviewed In Search of Forever for White Dwarf #72, and stated that "Grab this and get his Witch World covers without having to buy dreadful Andre Norton books..."

Reviews
Review by Chris Morgan (1985) in Fantasy Review, November 1985
Review by Don D'Ammassa (1986) in Science Fiction Chronicle, #87 December 1986

References

Books about visual art